Frank and Wendy is a 2005 Estonian animated film directed by Kaspar Jancis, Ülo Pikkov, and Priit Tender. It was released on December 3, 2004 (Black Nights Film Festival), March 25, 2005 (Estonia)

Plot

Cast

Accolades
Awards:
 2004: annual award by Cultural Endowment of Estonia (best animated film of the year)
 2005: ANIFEST - International Festival of Animated Films (Teplice, Czech), best television film
 2006: FEST – Youth Video and Film Festival (Espinho, Portugal), audience prize for the best animated film

References

External links
 
 Frank and Wendy, entry in Estonian Film Database (EFIS)

2005 films
Estonian animated films